Seán Broderick (1890 – 20 August 1953) was an Irish politician. He was Officer Commanding, 4th Battalion, Galway Brigade of the Irish Republican Army (IRA) during the Irish War of Independence.

Broderick came from Prospect Hill, Galway. In 1919, while an officer of the IRA in Galway, he was arrested by the Black and Tans after one of their number had been shot dead during an altercation at a railway station. He was summarily put against a wall, shot, and left for dead; however, he had only been lightly wounded and managed to escape and go on the run. He survived the war to lead the IRA into Renmore Barracks on the day the British left.

He was first elected to Dáil Éireann as a Cumann na nGaedheal Teachta Dála (TD) for the Galway constituency at the 1923 general election. He was re-elected at each subsequent election until lost his seat at the 1943 general election. From the 1937 general election onwards, he was elected as a Fine Gael TD for the Galway East constituency.

References

1890 births
1953 deaths
Cumann na nGaedheal TDs
Fine Gael TDs
Members of the 4th Dáil
Members of the 5th Dáil
Members of the 6th Dáil
Members of the 7th Dáil
Members of the 8th Dáil
Members of the 9th Dáil
Members of the 10th Dáil
Politicians from County Galway